Iain Ross Turner (born 26 January 1984) is a Scottish former professional footballer, who played as a goalkeeper and who works as goalkeeping coach at Tranmere Rovers. He represented the Scotland under-21 team, the Scotland B team and been selected for the full Scotland squad. Turner previously played for Stirling Albion, Barnsley, Everton and several other clubs on loan.

Club career
Born in Stirling, Turner arrived at Everton after impressing with his local team, Stirling Albion, signing for £50,000 in March 2003. The Scotland under-21 international, also capped at under-16 and under-18 level, has spent time gaining experience on loan at Chester City (where he won a Conference National championship medal in 2004), Doncaster Rovers, Wycombe Wanderers and Crystal Palace.

Turner found national fame when he was sent off after only nine minutes during his Premier League debut for the Toffees against Blackburn Rovers, after picking up a header from one of his own defenders, Alan Stubbs, outside the penalty area.

He signed for Sheffield Wednesday on a month's loan in February 2007 making his debut at home in the win against Southend United on 24 February 2007. Prior to Turner signing for Sheffield Wednesday, the club had failed to win in nine games. His arrival at the club sparked an upturn in form, and he helped them to avoid defeat in each of the eleven games in which he played during his loan spell. In March 2009 Turner signed for Nottingham Forest on loan until the end of the 2008–09 season. During his spell at Forest, Turner saved a penalty hit by Jamal Campbell-Ryce in a league match between Forest and Barnsley. In August 2010 he signed on a month emergency loan to Coventry City as back-up to Keiren Westwood. Turner signed for Preston North End on a 93-day emergency loan on 9 February 2011, replacing Andy Lonergan, the regular Preston goalkeeper.

After Lonergan left Preston to join Leeds United, Turner signed a one-year contract with Preston on 29 July 2011. On 27 August 2011, Turner scored his first ever career goal in the 86th minute of a league match against Notts County, sending a long ball bouncing over the head of his opposite number Stuart Nelson. Turner suffered an injury to his foot on 3 November 2011. Preston then signed a new goalkeeper from Germany, Thorsten Stuckmann, who kept Turner out of the first team when he returned from injury. Turner was loaned to Dunfermline Athletic in January 2012, but this contract was cancelled after he suffered an injury in training. In May 2012, Turner was released from the club after being told his contract would not be renewed.

On 30 January 2014, Turner signed a short-term contract with Barnsley.

On 15 August 2014, Turner signed a six-month contract with Sheffield United. Turner made his Blades début on 7 October 2014 as the Blades won 2–1 away at Hartlepool United in the Football League Trophy. Despite being Sheffield United’s second choice goalkeeper, he made several more appearances for the Blades and made some excellent saves in a 2–0 victory over Swindon Town in January 2015.

In July 2017 he signed for Southport as a player and goalkeeping coach.

International career
Turner represented the Scotland B side in May 2009. He was called up to the full Scotland squad in August 2010 as a replacement for the injured David Marshall. He was sometimes selected for the squad under the management of Craig Levein, but did not play.

Career statistics

References

External links

1984 births
Footballers from Stirling
Chester City F.C. players
National League (English football) players
Crystal Palace F.C. players
Doncaster Rovers F.C. players
Dunfermline Athletic F.C. players
Everton F.C. players
Association football goalkeepers
Living people
Nottingham Forest F.C. players
Coventry City F.C. players
Premier League players
Preston North End F.C. players
Barnsley F.C. players
Sheffield United F.C. players
Scotland B international footballers
Scotland under-21 international footballers
Scottish Football League players
Scottish footballers
Stirling Albion F.C. players
English Football League players
Wycombe Wanderers F.C. players
Scotland youth international footballers
Scottish Premier League players
Sheffield Wednesday F.C. players
Tranmere Rovers F.C. players
Southport F.C. players